Indian Village may refer to several places in the United States: 

Indian Village, California
Indian Village, Chicago, Illinois
Indian Village, Indiana
Indian Village Historic District (Fort Wayne, Indiana), listed on the National Register of Historic Places (NRHP)
Indian Village, Noble County, Indiana
Indian Village, Tippecanoe County, Indiana
Indian Village on Pawnee Fork, NRHP-listed in Ness County, Kansas
Indian Village, Louisiana, in Iberville Parish, Louisiana
Indian Village, Detroit, Michigan
 Indian Village, Bronx, New York
 Indian Village, Oregon

See also
 Indian Village State Preserve, near Sutherland, Iowa
 Indian Village Township, Tama County, Iowa
 Indian Village Historic District (disambiguation)
 Indian Creek Village (disambiguation)